Located in the northeastern portion of the Indianapolis MSA (Metropolitan Statistical Area), Saxony is a  mixed-use New Urbanism development that spans both sides of I-69 at Exit 210 in Hamilton County, Indiana. At full build-out, this $1.5 billion project will include a mix of corporate office, medical, contract research, retail, entertainment, civic, multi-family and single-family uses. The development currently is home to a number of service retailers such as hotels, banks, professional services and a post office.

Amenities

Saxony straddles the Town of Fishers, Indiana and the City of Noblesville, both rapidly growing areas within affluent Hamilton County, Indiana. The Saxony area has become a hub for health care services, with the three largest Indiana-based health care providers having located major medical facilities there. In Saxony, IU Health has built a hospital, Indiana University Health Saxony Hospital, which opened in December 2011. IU Health Saxony Hospital will focus primarily on cardiovascular, orthopedic and spine surgical services.

Development 

Republic Development, an Ohio-based developer, launched Saxony in 2001 and is in the process of overseeing build out of the development. Republic Development has completed numerous residential and commercial projects in Indiana, Ohio, Florida, and North Carolina.

Completed projects at Saxony  
Bonn Building
Cambria Suites
Community Health Network   
Drees Homes
The Traditions
The Cottages
The Estates
Carriage Manor
Intrametco
M/I Homes
Northparke at Saxony
The Playschool at Saxony
STAR Financial Bank
Wesleyan World Headquarters
Hannover on the Green
U.S. Postal Office – first Indiana self-service facility
Mike's Carwash
Verus
Fischer Homes
Indiana University Health Saxony Hospital
Performance Marketing Group (PMG)
The District at Saxony
Westport Homes
Famous Dave's BBQ
David Weekley Homes
Panda Express
IFP Automation 
Indiana Fluid Power

Current projects at Saxony  
Lake District
Towne Market

References 

Buildings and structures in Hamilton County, Indiana
Neighborhoods in Indiana
New Urbanism communities
Geography of Hamilton County, Indiana